Resolution was a small American schooner, built in the Marquesas Islands in 1793 as a tender for the maritime fur trade ship Jefferson. Later in 1793 she arrived at the Columbia River, becoming the fourth European vessel to enter the river. Cruised between the Columbia River and Clayoquot Sound. In March 1794, Resolution separated from Jefferson. After several brief voyages she was captured and destroyed by Haida chief Cumshewa and his followers in 1794. All the crew but one were killed. The lone survivor was later rescued by the Boston ship Despatch.

Construction
The wooden frame for Resolutions hull was prefabricated in Boston in 1790 and transported to the Pacific Ocean aboard the fur trading vessel Jefferson in a voyage commencing in November 1791. After a year at sea, Jefferson anchored in Resolution Bay on Santa Christina Island in the Marquesas shortly before Christmas in 1792. Her captain Josiah Roberts ordered the frame to be unloaded and built into a small schooner that he named Resolution in honour of the Bay in which it was assembled.

The newly built Resolution was launched on February 8, 1793. Sea trials showed that she sailed well and fast, and would be capable of making the voyage from the Marquesas to the North American mainland. Roberts selected 12 men from Jefferson to be her crew and appointed one, a Mr. Burling, as captain. Her first mate was Solomon Kendrick, who had previously visited the Pacific Northwest as part of his father John Kendrick's 1788 expedition to Nootka Sound.

The Resolution sailed with the Jefferson as her tender. On 19 May 1793 the vessels reached the Pacific Northwest Coast, entered the Columbia River. They cruised between the Columbia and Clayoquot Sound until March 1794 when they separated to collect furs, intending to join company later. The Jefferson never saw the Resolution again. Its fate was later learned from several sources, including logs from the merchant ships Ruby and Despatch. The Resolution was captured by Haida chief Cumshewa and his people in 1794. All the crew but one were killed, including Captain Burling and Solomon Kendrick. The lone survivor was later rescued by the Boston ship Despatch. In 1799 the merchant ship Eliza under Captain Samuel Burling visited the Kaigani Haida of Dall Island at the trading site known as "Kaigani". Chief Altatsee told Captain Burling that the Cumshewa Haida had killed his brother and Solomon Kendrick.

See also
John Kendrick Jr
List of ships in British Columbia

Notes

Citations

References

External links

Haida Gwaii
Fur trade
Age of Sail merchant ships
Age of Sail merchant ships of the United States
Merchant ships of the United States
Pre-Confederation British Columbia
1793 ships